Fredensborg Slot (also Fredensborg Slott or simply Fredensborg) was a chinaman of the Danish Asiatic Company (DAC). She comåpleted six expeditions to Canton between 1765 and 1778.

Construction and design
Fredensborg Slot was constructed at Asiatisk Plads. She was the 13th ship constructed at the DAC's own shipyard. She was designed by Frederik Michael Krabbe and the master shipbuilder Poul Frantzen (Frandsen) was responsible for overseeing the actual construction. Her  was issued on 10 or 14 October 1765.

DAC service
Fredensborg Slot completed six DAC expeditions to Canton in 1765-67, 1767-69, 1769-71, 1771-72, 1775-76 and 1777-78.

Henrich Matthias Foss (1777-78).

References

External links

Ships of the Danish Asiatic Company
Ships designed by Frederik Michael Krabbe
Frigates of Denmark
Ships built in Copenhagen
1765 ships